Middlebush may refer to:

Places
 Middlebush, New Jersey, in Somerset County
 Middlebush Brook (New Jersey), a tributary of Six Mile Run in Somerset County

Other
 Middlebush Reformed Church, in Middlebush, New Jersey
 Middlebush Village Historic District, listed on the National Register of Historic Places in Somerset County, New Jersey
 Frederick Middlebush, thirteenth president of the University of Missouri in Columbia, Missouri
 The Middlebush Giant, also known as Colonel Routh Goshen

See also